Archierato columbella is a species of small sea snail, a marine gastropod mollusk in the family Eratoidae, the false cowries or trivias and allies.

Distribution
This is an Eastern Pacific species, whose range is from Monterey Bay, California, south to Panama.

References

 Turgeon, D.; Quinn, J.F.; Bogan, A.E.; Coan, E.V.; Hochberg, F.G.; Lyons, W.G.; Mikkelsen, P.M.; Neves, R.J.; Roper, C.F.E.; Rosenberg, G.; Roth, B.; Scheltema, A.; Thompson, F.G.; Vecchione, M.; Williams, J.D. (1998). Common and scientific names of aquatic invertebrates from the United States and Canada: mollusks. 2nd ed. American Fisheries Society Special Publication, 26. American Fisheries Society: Bethesda, MD (USA). . IX, 526 + cd-rom pp.
 Keen, A. M. 1971. Sea Shells of Tropical West America. Marine mollusks from Baja California to Peru, ed. 2. Stanford University Press. xv, 1064 pp., 22 pls.

Exyernal links
 Menke, C. T. (1847). Verzeichniss einer Sendung von Conchylien von Mazatlan, mit einigen kritischen Bemerkungen. Zeitschrift für Malakozoologie. 4: 177-191
 Gould, A. A. (1853). Descriptions of shells from the Gulf of California and the Pacific coasts of Mexico and California. Boston Journal of Natural History. 6: 374-407, pls 14-16
 Mörch, O. A. L. (1860). Beiträge zur Molluskenfauna Central-Amerika's. Malakozoologische Blätter. 7: 66–106
 Fehse D. & Simone L.R.L. (2020). Contributions to the knowledge of the Eratoidae. X. Revision of the genus Archierato Schilder, 1933 (Mollusca: Gastropoda). Zootaxa. 4851(1): 81-110.

Eratoidae
Gastropods described in 1847